Spirocyclina is a genus of large forams, with a flat test as much as 10mm in diameter. Coiling is  planispiral to slightly asymmetric and mostly involute, some becoming uncoiled with a straight final stage. The final whorl, or stage, has about 25 strongly arcuate chambers. Composition is of agglutinated matter, the outer layer of the wall  imperforate. Chambers are subdivided into secondary chamberlets by internal structures. The aperture consists of a double row of pores on the apertural face. 
Anchispirocyclina and Martiguesia are among related genera.

References 

 Alfred R. Loeblich, jr & Helen Tappan 1964. Sarcodina, Chiefly "Thecamoebians" and Foraminiferida. Treatise on Invertebrate Paleontology, Part C, Protista 2.  Geological Society of America and University of Kansas Press. 
 A.R. Loeblich & H Tappan, 1988 in GSI.ir Paleontology. 
 Rotaliata, Textulariana 

Loftusiida
Foraminifera genera